Belgrade Design Week is an international festival established in 2005, and held once a year in Belgrade, Serbia. The week-long conference is organized every spring and is the largest design initiative in South-Eastern Europe. It covers architecture, design, fashion, publishing, and new media, as well as related fields like communications, marketing, advertising, and arts management.  The event includes design labs, competitions, and presentations from international speakers like Karim Rashid and Daniel Libeskind.

During the rest of the year, there are related projects such as promoting local designers, holding a branding competition for the Serbian Center for the Promotion of Science, and participating in the Partners of the Human Cities/ Project. The organization also spearheaded the Belgrade 2020 project, promoting the city as a candidate for the European Capital of Culture.

History 
First held in 2005, Belgrade Design Week festival was founded by brand consultant Jovan Jelovac, a formally trained architect. The conference costs about half a million euros to produce and is supported mostly through commercial and media sponsorships. For Jelovac, education was the primary reason for launching the summit, as well as inspiring the country's citizens through design. In 2014, the president of Serbia, Tomislav Nikolić, presided over the event, mentioning how design can contribute to the country's economy.

In 2006, designer Karim Rashid was the ambassador for the second Belgrade Design Week and spoke at the conference. Subsequently, he headed several design projects in Serbia's capital city. Rashid stated that he is fascinated by Belgrade and Eastern Europe in general, seeing it "as the next upcoming place - everyone is psyched and enthusiastic about the rebuilding of these poetic, romantic, artistic and very intellectual places."

After attending the design festival in 2008, architect Daniel Libeskind left with a billion dollar, albeit controversial, commission to redevelop the Belgrade waterfront. Major projects such as this one are contributing to the renewal of the city. Other skyscrapers and shopping malls are in the planning stages, and architectural masterpieces, like the Art Nouveau "Geozavod" building, are being restored.  Belgrade is being compared to 1990's Berlin, seen as a decaying but alive metropolis: "Recently, the gritty city has emerged as an outpost of creative activity and urban cool on the cheap, against the lingering backdrop of socialism."

About 
The principal site of the festival changes annually with various run-down or abandoned buildings being renovated for the event. Past locations have included a palace, the bombed-out hotel Jugoslavija, an abandoned department store, the closed contemporary art museum, and an old factory.  Every year, the conference also focuses on a common thread, for example, in 2013 the unifying theme was the square shape.

Approximately thirty international speakers present each year and cover a wide range of subjects, helping to promote cultural exchanges between Serbia and the rest of the world. Notable designers and artists who have spoken at the event include Konstantin Grcic, Aylin Langreuter, Christophe de la Fontaine, Hella Jongerius, Daan Roosegaarde, Ross Lovegrove. Christophe Pillet, Sacha Lakic and Patricia Urquiola.

In addition to the presentations, there are numerous workshops and design competitions, as well as exhibits from designers such as Israeli Eilon Armon and Swiss architect duo Lang/Baumann.

See also
 Belgrade Fashion Week
 The Applied Artists and Designers Association of Serbia

References

External links
 Official website 
 http://www.gaf.ni.ac.rs/_news/_info/conf11/BDW2011_Brochure.pdf
 https://eastwest.eu/attachments/article/1137/169_173_lucicINGL.pdf
 https://issuu.com/advserb/docs/dizajnpark_magazine_2011
 https://www.designboom.com/art/nikola-bozovic-car-parts-phantasms-and-phalluses-belgrade-design-week-10-17-2014/
 https://www.designboom.com/design/tom-strala-belgrade-design-week-2014-11-17-2014/

Fashion festivals
International conferences
Fashion events in Serbia
Events in Belgrade
Industrial design awards
Festivals in Serbia
Design events
June events
Spring (season) events
Annual events in Serbia
Spring (season) events in Serbia
Serbian fashion